Ten Horns – Ten Diadems is a compilation album by the Norwegian black metal band Satyricon.

Track listing
"Filthgrinder" – 6:42
"Dominions of Satyricon" – 9:26 (Remastered)
"Forhekset" – 4:31
"Night of Divine Power" – 5:49 (Remastered)
"Hvite Krists Død" – 8:29
"Mother North" – 6:25
"Supersonic Journey" – 7:48
"Taakeslottet" – 5:52 (Remastered)
"Serpent's Rise" – 3:20
"Repined Bastard Nation" – 5:42

External links
Satyricon Discography

Satyricon (band) albums
2002 greatest hits albums